Anne Rice's Interview with the Vampire, or simply Interview with the Vampire, is an American gothic horror television series created by Rolin Jones for AMC, based on the 1976 novel of the same name by Anne Rice. The series follows the vampire Louis de Pointe du Lac (Jacob Anderson) who recounts his life with his maker Lestat de Lioncourt (Sam Reid) and teenage vampire Claudia (Bailey Bass) to veteran journalist Daniel Molloy (Eric Bogosian), accompanied by ancient vampire Armand (Assad Zaman). The series embraces the homosexual elements of Rice's work, which are only insinuated in the 1994 film adaptation of the novel. It is the first television series in Rice's Immortal Universe.

Interview with the Vampire received a series order in June 2021, after AMC Networks had purchased the rights to intellectual property encompassing 18 of Rice's novels, primarily The Vampire Chronicles, in 2020. The series was renewed for an eight-episode second season in September 2022, ahead of the premiere of its first season on October 2, 2022.

The first season received critical acclaim, with praise going towards the writing, tone, costumes, soundtrack, production values, performances (particularly that of Anderson and Reid), and chemistry between the two actors.

Premise 
Adapted from Anne Rice's 1976 gothic horror novel Interview with the Vampire, the series centers on the life story of vampire Louis de Pointe du Lac (Jacob Anderson), as told to journalist Daniel Molloy (Eric Bogosian). An affluent black man in 1910s New Orleans, Louis is romanced and later made a vampire by the charismatic Lestat de Lioncourt (Sam Reid). But the price of immortality is steep, and the relationship between Louis and Lestat is further complicated by the introduction of Lestat's newest fledgling, the teenage vampire Claudia (Bailey Bass).

Cast and characters

Main 
 Jacob Anderson as Louis de Pointe du Lac
 Sam Reid as Lestat de Lioncourt
 Eric Bogosian as Daniel Molloy
 Bailey Bass as Claudia
 Assad Zaman as Rashid/Armand

Recurring 

 Kalyne Coleman as Grace de Pointe du Lac, Louis's sister 
 Rae Dawn Chong as Florence de Pointe du Lac, Louis's mother 
 Chris Stack as Thomas "Tom" Anderson, the owner of the Fair Play Saloon, an upscale brothel 
 Christian Robinson as Levi Freniere, Grace's new husband 
 Maura Grace Athari as Antoinette, a blues singer who becomes romantically involved with Lestat
 Ben Daniels as Santiago (season 2), the leading thespian of Theatre des Vampires

Guest 

 Steven Norfleet as Paul de Pointe du Lac, Louis's troubled brother 
 John DiMaggio as Alderman Fenwick, a businessman looking to take advantage of Louis 
 Jeff Pope as Finn O'Shea, one of Louis's enforcers 
 Dana Gourrier as Bricktop Williams, a prostitute who works for Louis 
 Najah Bradley as Lily, a prostitute who works at the Fair Play and is a friend of Louis 
 Eugenie Nall Bondurant as Miss Carol, the madam of the Fair Play 
 Rachel Handler as Peg Leg Doris, a one-legged prostitute in Louis's employ 
 Mike Harkins as Father Mattias, a local priest who has known Louis since he was a child 
 Thomas Anthony Olajide as Jonah, Louis's childhood friend 
 Kyle Roussel as Jelly Roll Morton 
 Xavier Mills as Charlie, a man with whom Claudia falls in love 
 Damon Daunno as Bruce, a lone vampire Claudia meets during her travels 
 Luke Brandon Field as Young Daniel Molloy 
 Gopal Divan as Dr. Fareed Bhansali, a physician Louis brings in for Daniel

Episodes

Production

Development 
A new franchise adaptation of Anne Rice's The Vampire Chronicles was initially in development as a film series at Universal Pictures and Imagine Entertainment. The novel series had previously been adapted into Interview with the Vampire, starring Tom Cruise and Brad Pitt, in 1994 and the less commercially successful 2002 sequel, Queen of the Damned. Rice's son, Christopher Rice, had adapted the screenplay, and Alex Kurtzman and Roberto Orci were set as producers. The project paused until November 26, 2016, when Anne Rice had regained the rights to the franchise with the intention to develop the novels into a television series, where she and her son would serve as executive producers. Upon this announcement, Rice stated, "A television series of the highest quality is now my dream for Lestat, Louis, Armand, Marius, and the entire tribe. Though we had the pleasure of working with many fine people in connection with this plan, it did not work out. It is, more than ever, abundantly clear that television is where the vampires belong."

On April 28, 2017, it was announced that Paramount Television Studios and Anonymous Content had optioned the rights after a competitive month-long bidding war. Christopher Rice was attached to rewrite the screenplay, with Anonymous Content's David Kanter and Steve Golin joining as executive producers. On January 11, 2018, Bryan Fuller became the showrunner, but quit later that month to not interfere with what the Rices were planning. In a competitive situation, Hulu put the project in development on July 17, 2018, with Dee Johnson replacing Fuller as showrunner on February 19, 2019. It was later announced on December 19, 2019, that Hulu had decided not to move forward with the project, with Rice adding her trilogy Lives of the Mayfair Witches, the rights to which were still owned by Warner Bros. Pictures, to the larger, complete rights package. Paramount Television was in a position to regain the rights to the novels as it was reported the studio was among the four bidders seeking the property.

On May 13, 2020, it was announced that AMC Networks had purchased the rights to the intellectual property encompassing 18 novels and the possibility to develop feature films and television series from the deal. On June 24, 2021, AMC gave an adaptation of the first novel in the series, Interview with the Vampire, a series order consisting of eight episodes, with the series scheduled to premiere in 2022. Rolin Jones was attached as creator, showrunner, and writer. Mark Johnson was named executive producer alongside Jones under their overall deals with AMC Studios to oversee the universe for AMC. On July 19, 2021, it was announced that Alan Taylor was attached as an executive producer and to direct the first two episodes of the first season. On September 28, 2022, ahead of the series premiere, AMC renewed Interview with the Vampire for a second season which will cover the second half of the novel, bringing the series to a total of fifteen episodes. On January 10, 2023, Johnson announced that a crossover between Interview with the Vampire and Mayfair Witches is in the works.

Writing and themes 
In the original novel, Louis owns a plantation in the Antebellum South and the African slaves that work the land. In the series, Louis is a closeted Creole black man whose wealth comes from a chain of brothels in Storyville, a red light district in early 20th century New Orleans. Show creator and writer Rolin Jones said that the changes were made to place the story in a "time period that was as exciting aesthetically as the 18th century was without digging into a plantation story that nobody really wanted to hear now". The series also embraces the homosexual relationship existing in Rice's novels explicitly, unlike the 1994 film adaptation. On the relationship between the two lead characters, Jones stated that the show is a gothic romance, and that he wanted to "write a very excitable, aggressive, toxic, beautiful love story". Jenna Scherer of The A.V. Club wrote that "this reversal adds fascinating depths to Louis and allows Interview to grapple with prickly questions of race, sexuality, and history."

Casting

Season 1 
In August 2021, it was announced that Sam Reid and Jacob Anderson were cast in the lead roles of Lestat de Lioncourt and Louis de Pointe du Lac. In October 2021, it was reported that Bailey Bass joined the cast in a starring role as Claudia, and Kalyne Coleman would recur as Grace, Louis's sister. In March 2022, Assad Zaman was cast in a starring role as Rashid, while Eric Bogosian was cast as Daniel Molloy in an undisclosed capacity. In April 2022, AMC announced the casting of Maura Grace Athari as Antoinette, a blues singer "whose relationship with Lestat disrupts our two vampires' domestic tranquility."

Season 2 
Casting announcements for season two began in March 2023, with Ben Daniels announced to play a recurring role as Santiago, a member of the Theatre des Vampires "who grows increasingly suspicious of the American vampires Louis and Claudia."

Filming 
Principal photography for the first season began in late 2021, running from December to April 2022 in New Orleans. Production designer Mara LaPere-Schloop recreated Storyville district by building about 40 period building facades for the show's Iberville and Liberty Street on a backlot at The Ranch Studios in Chalmette from October 2021 to January 2022. The show was also shot at several New Orleans landmarks, including Gallier House, which Anne Rice used as the model for Lestat's townhouse, and Beauregard-Keyes House, for the interior of Fair Play Saloon.

The second season is set to begin filming from April to August 2023, with most of the shoot taking place in Prague, which will stand for Paris. There are limited plans to also film in Paris and New Orleans.

Release 
The series premiered on AMC on October 2, 2022, but was available three days earlier on AMC's sister streaming service AMC+. Subsequent episodes are released on AMC+ one week prior to their cable premieres.

Music 

On September 6, 2022, Daniel Hart has been confirmed as composer of the original music for Interview with the Vampire. On October 1, 2022, a preview of the soundtrack was released with the musical "Overture" track. The first season music score entitled Interview with the Vampire (Original Television Series Soundtrack) was be released by Milan Records digitally on October 21, 2022, which was described as Hart "embracing the complexity of Anne Rice's classic novel with a soaring, orchestral score befitting the lush, gothic tale of love and immortality." On January 18, 2023, the physical CD of the soundtrack was made available for pre-order on Amazon, with a release date of March 3, 2023.

Since its release day, the album was met with praise, saying that "Hart has the ability to surprise [...] his Interview with the Vampire is outstanding, one of the best television scores in 2022"; and "Hart's take on these immortal beings is rich and lush and classical, with music that is awash in swooning violins, elegant pianos, and boldly romantic orchestral gestures." Vanity Fair says that "the score is haunting". Time says, "Interview is soundtracked by The Green Knight composer Daniel Hart's elegant, ominous score." Mashable wrote, "The poetic dialogue combined with powerful acting, the New Orleans scenery, and a swooning score left me breathless." Den of Geek wrote, "From the opening dissonant chord, the score is exciting enough to move transitioning street thug Louis to perform a soft-shoe duet, and classically-trained musician Lestat to put a boogie-woogie rhythm to a Bach figured bass." Decider wrote, "Daniel Hart's score is like something out of Old Hollywood. Hell, they even put ominous thunderclaps in the background during Lestat's assault on the church and conversion of Louis into the undead." Comic Book Resources wrote, "There are two major classes of music in film media: diegetic music and incidental music [...] Interview with the Vampire manages both forms carefully and brilliantly, making music just as important to the characters as the viewers, even though they hear very different music."

IndieWire listed the album as one of the best TV scores of 2022, placing it at number eight overall on the list, and says: "In setting an immortal and doomed love story to music, Daniel Hart's violin-heavy score arpeggiates its way into the infinite. Vampire tales are a blend of tragedy and romance. Hart provides both. The aggressive bowing and dissonant piano melodies give way to graceful, lush lines of discovery. Hart can tiptoe his way between something full and fierce and a haunting music-box feel." Vulture named the use of Charles Manson's "Home Is Where You're Happy" at the end of the fifth episode as the ninth best song in a TV show and wrote, "It's just hard to hear that happiness when you recall the fate of Sharon Tate, which is what makes the song a strong choice for the soundtrack of a show about magnetic mass murderers, even when they're of the supernatural variety."

On working on the series, Hart says it was "an honor been to play a small part in the telling of these beautifully complex, resonant stories." On working with showrunner Rolin Jones, he says that they "spoke at length about what instrumentation, melodies, and rhythms would suit best to capture the love, the misery, the anger and more." On the characters' relationship with the music, he says that "found their stories to be full of endless melodies [...] Music is such a huge part of their lives and journeys." Hart also praises Sam Reid in the original track sung by the actor: "I think the response to the song that Sam sang is the most gratifying thing for me. I think it sounds amazing. I think his voice sounds like a singer's voice, and that it's quite powerful performance."

The album of music from the series contains 18 instrumental tracks and the original vocal song "Come to Me" composed by Hart and performed by Reid, available to stream, download and purchase on Amazon Music, Apple Music, Spotify and any other major digital music services.

The following are the tracks from season one that are on that album:

Reception

Critical response 

The first season of Interview with the Vampire has received critical acclaim, with praise going towards the writing, tone, costumes, soundtrack, production values, chemistry between the two lead actors, and performances of the cast. The review aggregator website Rotten Tomatoes reported a 99% approval rating with an average rating of 8.2/10, based on 68 critic reviews. The website's critics consensus reads, "With a playful tone and an expansive sweep that allows Anne Rice's gothic opus to mull like a chalice of blood, Interview with the Vampire puts a stake through concerns that this story couldn't be successfully resurrected." Metacritic, which uses a weighted average, assigned a score of 81 out of 100 based on 26 critics, indicating "universal acclaim".

Variety included Anderson and Reid in its list of "Best TV Performances" of 2022 and wrote, "Jacob Anderson and Sam Reid rose to the occasion with unforgettable style. Reid unleashed hell as the perpetually hungry Lestat, Anderson gave one of the year's point-blank best performances [...] it's all too easy to understand why millions remain so invested in this romance, vicious and doomed though it is." TV Guide also listed both Anderson and Reid as one of the 20 best TV performances of the year, placing them at number five, and wrote, "Their sizzling chemistry and wholehearted commitment to making Louis and Lestat's hell marriage as toxic as possible is what makes Interview with the Vampire work. Separately, Anderson and Reid are exemplary. Together, they're lightning in a bottle." IndieWire included Reid in its list of "28 Best Film and TV Performances" of the year and wrote, "Reid took on the role with all the force, charm, and horror that [Anne] Rice dished out in her 1976 book. [...] Every minute of Reid's performance here is a master class in manipulation." Additionally, the website also named the series' poster one of the "33 Best Film and TV Posters of 2022". The A.V. Club also listed Anderson as one of the 16 best TV performances of 2022, placing him at number fourteen, and wrote, "Anderson is equal parts charming and heartbreaking as Louis. The show delves into queer elements far more than the film did (sold thoroughly thanks to Anderson and Reid's chemistry). With his invigorating work, Anderson doesn’t just live up to the film's take on Louis, previously played by Brad Pitt, but he arguably exceeds it." Film School Rejects named the final scene of the first episode as the twelfth best of the year and wrote, "The scene itself embodies all of the show’s facets, beginning with a brilliant performance from Anderson [...] Reid flits from frightening to seductive to arrogant and back again as Rice’s Brat Prince personified. Interview with the Vampire has made the best first impression of any show this year." CNN included the series in its article on the return of the "beloved fantasy realms" on TV and wrote, "The series makes sexuality and race central themes, inextricably tied to the story of emotionally tortured vampires trying to be a family and the journalist trying to get the story."

Especially for the chemistry between the two actors, TVLine included a scene between Anderson and Reid's characters from the first episode in its list of "17 Sexiest Scenes" in 2022 and wrote, "It was love at first bite for Louis and Lestat, whose off-the-charts chemistry was undeniable in the show's premiere as temptation gave way to seduction." Time praises the performances of Anderson and Reid and wrote, "Only actors with the chemistry of Jacob Anderson and Sam Reid, who play Interview’s central couple, could make the passion between immortal lovers." Decider also named Anderson and Reid as the co-stars who "oozed the most incandescent chemistry with each other this year" and wrote, "Together these two actors vibe on a wavelength that is nothing short of magical. [...] Reid and Anderson let their bodies expose their characters' emotions. They have an electric connection and the kind of chemistry that becomes legendary." The same website listed a sex scene as the fourth best of the year and wrote, "Only one show this year showed us just how magical the otherworldly connection between two lovers could be. AMC's triumphant series works because of the intense bond between the vampire Lestat and his beloved, bedraggled creation Louis." Queerty listed the scene as one of the 10 hottest, wildest, gayest TV moments of 2022, placing it at number six, and wrote, "In its premiere, Louis (Anderson) and Lestat (Reid) lunge at each other with an animal-like intensity." TV Insider included Anderson and Reid in its list of "16 Breakout TV Stars" of 2022 and wrote, "There's no separating Louis and Lestat." Collider also included Louis and Lestat in its list of "Best TV Duos" of 2022 and wrote, "The actors’ chemistry is off the charts from the start [...] Even when Louis is angry with Lestat, they only want each other more." Vanity Fair praises the portrayal of Louis and Lestat in the series and wrote, "Anderson and Reid's chemistry is unrivaled. To watch them on screen together is to watch a master class in charm and manipulation, in lust and anguish. Anderson conveys unimaginable depth [...] Reid, a storm of intoxicating fury, is magnetic." Pride named the series the best TV show of 2022 and wrote, "But most importantly of all, the chemistry between stars Jacob Anderson and Sam Reid is astronomical."

For individual episodes, the season finale "The Thing Lay Still" was named the best TV episode of 2022 by Mashable. Slashfilm ranked the first episode "In Throes of Increasing Wonder..." as the tenth best TV episode of the year and wrote, "The series' first episode is a variety pack of indelibly dark and entertaining moments, from Louis and Lestat's naked, hovering consummation to the gory finale that sees Lestat punch a hole through a priest's head to show his new lover he means business." Syfy Wire also included the first episode in its list of "Best Sci-Fi and Horror TV Episodes of 2022" and wrote, "Smart, richly produced, and perfectly acted, we get a fresh take and an updating of Rice's book and mythology that honors her world", while Primetimer included the episode in its list of "Best TV Episodes of 2022" and wrote, "A thrilling — if ironic — breath of life, proving that TV's determination to cannibalize any and all intellectual property can still show us something new." TV Guide placed the sixth episode "Like Angels Put in Hell by God" as the eleventh best TV episode of the year in its "20 Best TV Episodes" list, who also included the first episode in its list of "6 Shows and Episodes That Blew Up the Group Chat in 2022" and wrote, "All of the group chats agreed that each episode brought unexpected drama and an excitement to watch week-to-week that is so treasured when watching TV is legitimately your job." Meanwhile, Entertainment Weekly included the fourth episode "The Ruthless Pursuit of Blood with All a Child's Demanding" in its unranked list of "33 best TV episodes of 2022". Collider included the season finale in its list of "Best TV Episodes of 2022", while TV Insider included the same episode in its list of "25 TV Episodes From 2022 We Can’t Stop Thinking About".

Critics' top lists
Interview with the Vampire was named the best reviewed horror series of 2022 by Rotten Tomatoes, as well as one of the best reviewed TV series and new series of the year. The series was placed at number 19 on Metacritic's year-end list of most mentioned TV shows by critics as "Best of 2022".

Ratings 
The premiere of Interview with the Vampire ranked as the number one new series launch ever for AMC+, and along with the return of The Walking Dead, drove the platform to its highest two days of viewership and subscriber growth since its October 2020 launch. The opening weekend performance put Interview with the Vampire alongside The Walking Dead and Better Call Saul as one of the top three new or returning series on AMC+. On AMC, 1.2 million viewers watched the premiere of the series, including 493.000 viewers in the 25–54 demographic based on Nielsen's live+3 ratings, making the series the number one new drama on ad-supported cable in 2022.

Awards and nominations

Notes

References

External links 
 
 
 

2020s American drama television series
2020s American horror television series
2022 American television series debuts
2020s American LGBT-related drama television series
2020s American romance television series
2020s American supernatural television series
AMC (TV channel) original programming
American black television series
American horror fiction television series
English-language television shows
Gay-related television shows
Gothic television shows
Horror drama television series
Southern Gothic television series
Television series about vampires
Television series set in the 20th century
Television shows based on American novels
Television shows set in New Orleans
Vampires in television
Works based on The Vampire Chronicles